Zukhov may refer to:
Zhukov, Russian surname
Jim Barrell (b. 1959), wrestler whose stage name is "Boris Zukhov"

See also
 Žukov (disambiguation)